Cosmetic advertising is the promotion of cosmetics and beauty products by the cosmetics industry through a variety of media. The advertising campaigns are usually aimed at women wishing to improve their appearance, commonly to increase physical attractiveness and reduce the signs of ageing.

Persuasion 
The obsession with youth and beauty sends thousands of people to stores searching for a quick fix. Looking into cosmetics retailers, teenagers are trying on makeup to make them look more mature while middle-aged women are sourcing for the best anti-aging cream for her skin. The beauty industry relies on all kinds of persuasion techniques to sell products. Brands like to rely on celebrities to sell their beauty products. "If the product is good enough for her, it’s good enough for me." This philosophy is often the impetus behind advertisements for makeup, skin products, and hair products. This causes consumers spend extra money on items that might not be suitable or workable on themselves. Celebrities can also help to build brand awareness through promoting products as consumers believe the product is used by the celebrity and this can affect consumer's decision making.

Beauty product advertising bombard consumers on a daily basis. They create promises to consumers that certain product can make consumers look younger or that foundation can take years off your appearance. Beauty advertising often seek to consumers of the product value or even its necessity for the consumer's well-being and self-image.

The effectiveness of advertising depends on convincing consumer that the product can improve their appearance. They may use different methods to persuade individuals to make purchases. Association can be a powerful tool. As well as incentives like discounts. It targets emotional responses when the product is associated with feelings. As many people aware that their personal appearance can have a significant effect on how they are treated by others, advertising can use these concerns by encouraging the target market.

When beauty advertisements make promises that certain product can make consumers look younger. Beauty advertising often has little to do with the product. The product is often dwarfed by a beautiful woman's image. As beauty advertisement is selling the beauty and also the self-worth. This is also another important reason why celebrities are increasingly appeared on beauty products advertisements. Celebrities represent the best selves, they are beautiful and adored by millions. After consumer review those beauty product campaigns, they will start to get concerned about their appearance and start to shop for similar products because they want to be attractive, like the celebrities.

People not only expect to look good, but feel good too. Consumers expect the products will make them look better than they did without the products or even believe these products will make them more appealing like some of the models who advertise the products. Therefore, Advertisers use those buzzwords to appeal to a wider range of consumers and to wider their marketing strategy by targeting    new generations and gain the attention of diverse consumers.

Criticism
Many campaigns have come under fire through their alleged use of pseudoscience and their promotion of unrealistic goals. Moreover, many campaigns are accused of inducing harmful habits on people (such as bulimia and anorexia), and leading to destructive plastic surgery practices.

In addition, cosmetic advertising is often accused of excessively using photo manipulation to enhance the appearance of models, instead of using the cosmetics themselves, creating an unrealistic image of the product's benefits, Estée Lauder for example.

Cosmetics are a major expenditure for many women, with the cosmetics industry grossing around 7 billion dollars a year, according to a 2008 YWCA report. Cosmetic retailers design advertising to alter women's attitudes toward cosmetics, encouraging them to buy more products. Many advertisers shape this attitude by encouraging women to feel dissatisfied with their appearance. According to sociologist, Jean Kilbourne, adolescents are particularly vulnerable because they are new and inexperienced consumers and are the prime targets of many advertisements.  Study after study has proven that repeated exposure to ideal beauty as portrayed by the media causes detrimental psychological effects in children and adolescents ranging from distorted body images and lowered self-esteem to eating disorders and steroid use.

This thin ideal represents less than 5% of the American population leaving 95% of females with a beauty norm that is impossible to meet. Not only is it impossible to meet, but the model in the advertisement has often been photo manipulated. The flawlessness of advertising woman is, in fact, an illusion created by makeup artists, photographers, and photo re-touchers. Each image is painstakingly worked over: teeth and eyeballs are bleached white; blemishes, wrinkles, and stray hairs are airbrushed away. Media images convey normative information as to what an attractive body looks like that prompts women to evaluate their own body against this normative standard.

Beauty standards are essentially societal norms or expectations that are used to define a very specific idea of what should be considered beautiful and not conforming to society’s beauty standards can have detrimental effects on a person’s sense of worth. Researchers have found a correlation between exposure to cosmetic advertisements and body image issues among black women. For example, cosmetic companies tend to glorify euro-centric characteristics over other physical features and this leaves people who lack these traits extremely self-conscious. Matter of fact, an experiment discovered there was a correlation between the likelihood of women undergoing cosmetic surgery based on their body dissatisfaction before and after experiencing some form of cosmetic advertisement. The results supported the hypothesis that mental health issues, such as depression and anxiety, are more common among women who have undergone cosmetic surgery than their non-patient counterparts.

See also
Sex in advertising
Angel dusting
Cosmeceutical

References

External links
"Guidelines for Cosmetic Advertising and Labelling Claims" at the Advertising Standards Canada
Gibson, Owen.  17 August 2005. "L'Oréal pulls TV ads after ruling" at Guardian Unlimited

Advertising
Advertising by product